Rita Carewe (born Violette Fox, September 9, 1909 – October 22, 1955) was an American actress.

Family
Violette Fox was born on September 9, 1909 to Edwin Carewe (born Jay Fox) and Mary Jane Croft. She had a sister, Mary Jane. Fox's father, Edwin, was a film director/producer for United Artists. In 1914, he came to Hollywood as a director for Lubin Studios. Later he worked for Rolf-Metro, Selig Polyscope Company, and First National Pictures. He was married three times, twice to the actress Mary Akin.

Film career
Edwin signed Rita to a five-year contract with First National Pictures, in reward for her work in Joanna (1925), which he directed. Her first assignment under her new contract was in High Steppers (1926). The movie featured Dolores del Río, Mary Astor, and Lloyd Hughes. 

Carewe was selected as one of 13 actresses selected as one of the WAMPAS Baby Stars in 1927. The 100 members of WAMPAS  chose her, along with Natalie Kingston, Sally Phipps, Adamae Vaughn, Iris Stuart, and eight more as the actresses as most likely to succeed in the film world.

A committee of 25 important people in the industry promoted Carewe for the role of Lorelei Lee in Gentlemen Prefer Blondes (1928). The part was eventually won by Ruth Taylor. Carewe played the girl of the streets in Resurrection (1927). This was followed by a more important role, as Tina, in Revenge (1928). The film was based on a story written by gypsy author, Konrad Bercovici.

Her first motion picture in the sound medium was Prince Gabby (1929). She acted opposite Edward Everett Horton in a screen adaptation of an Edgar Wallace novel. Her final film appearance was in Radio Kisses (1930).

Marriage
Carewe eloped to Yuma, Arizona, with actor LeRoy Mason in July 1928. Mason had been discovered by Carewe's father at a sandwich counter. 

Carewe and Mason separated in December 1934, and she filed for divorce in November 1935. 

Rita Carewe died at age 45 in Torrance, California. She is interred in Angelus-Rosedale Cemetery in Los Angeles.

Filmography

 Joanna (1925)
 High Steppers (1926)
 Resurrection (1927)
 The Stronger Will (1928)
 Ramona (1928)
 Revenge (1928)
 Prince Gabby (1929)
 Radio Kisses (1930)

References
 Galveston Daily News, Born at Gainesville as Plain Jay Fox, Dies of Heart Attack, January 23, 1940, Page 7.
 Los Angeles Times, Pair Given Long-Term Contracts, October 28, 1925, Page A15.
 Los Angeles Times, Carewe Obtains Mary Astor For Heirs Apparent, December 20, 1925, Page C39.
 Los Angeles Times, New Baby Stars Stud Film Firmament, January 7, 1927, Page A1.
 Los Angeles Times, Rita Carewe In It, April 12, 1928, Page A10.
 Los Angeles Times, Delay Again Marks Trial Of Actress, January 18, 1929, Page A1.
 Los Angeles Times, Film Romance Upset Told, November 23, 1935, Page A3.
 Los Angeles Times, Suspect In Burglaries Arraigned, March 29, 1929, Page A1.
 New York Times, Brains and Blondes, June 26, 1927, Page X3.
 New York Times, Film Players Elope, July 14, 1928, Page 12.
 New York Times, Leroy Mason, October 15, 1947, Page 27.
 Syracuse Herald, Directors Come From Many Fields, August 12, 1929, Page 7.

External links

American film actresses
American silent film actresses
1909 births
1955 deaths
Actresses from New York City
Burials at Angelus-Rosedale Cemetery
20th-century American actresses
WAMPAS Baby Stars